Courdimanche is a commune in the Val-d'Oise department in Île-de-France in northern France.

Population

Education
Schools in the commune include:
École maternelle les Croizettes (preschool)
École élémentaire des Croizettes
Groupe scolaire André Parrain (primary school)
Groupe scolaire de la Louvière (primary school)
École privée Saint-Louis
Collège Sainte-Apolline (junior high school)

Lycée Jules Verne is in nearby  in Cergy.

See also
Communes of the Val-d'Oise department

References

External links

Official website 

Association of Mayors of the Val d'Oise 

Communes of Val-d'Oise
Cergy-Pontoise